Nick Brennan is a British cartoonist who works mainly for D. C. Thomson & Co. Ltd. He started drawing for the company in 1993, drawing a revival of Peter Piper from The Dandy, revived from The Magic Comic, but with a departure from Watkins' creation, with Peter instead sporting an Elvis-like hairdo and purple jumper.

January 1994 saw his next work Blinky, a revamp of the nephew of Colonel Blink from The Beezer who had first appeared in the merged Beezer and Topper in 1990.

In 1997, Nick drew a comic strip for a vote for The Beano which was called "Crazy for Daisy", and, along with Tim Traveller by Vic Neill, won the vote, followed by another strip, Pinky's Crackpot Circus, in 2004, and in 2006, a revival of "Brassneck" and "Noah's Ark". These last three are all from The Dandy. He also drew Sneaker for The Dandy plus a number of other less well-known characters such as Frawg. In the 2000s, Nick occasionally ghosted Nicky Nutjob, and contributed to the Fun Size Dandy/Fun Size Beano comics. In addition, he was the artist for Billy Whizz in The Beano from autumn 2009 until 2012.

Nick Brennan appeared a few times in The Dandy after its October 2010 revamp drawing Watch this Space and Professor Cheese's Olympic Wheezes. Reprints of Blinky, Pinky's Crackpot Circus, Brassneck and Sneaker were also used during 2012. In the final print edition of The Dandy, Nick drew Blinky, Peter Piper and Pinky's Crackpot Circus. A reprint of Hyde and Shriek was also used.

In the relaunched Digital Dandy, Nick produced Blinky and Sneaker with both stories being animated by his wife, Fran.

Nick's work appears in the Dandy Annual each year and he is currently working on scripts and artwork for the 2024 edition.

Recent work includes a newly-introduced Beano comic character, Stevie Star, and cartoon illustrations and animations for Beano Studios and the Beano for Schools projects featuring Dennis the Menace, Gnasher, Minnie the Minx and a host of other Beano faves.

In addition to comic work, Nick undertakes private and commercial commissions (event posters and cartoon illustration for business branding etc.) and runs cartoon workshops, such as the Art of Stories Festival at the Eden Project.

References

External links
Official websites
www.cartoonfun.co.uk
www.nickbrennancartoonist.co.uk
Nick Brennan LinkedIn Profile
Cartoonfun on LinkedIn

British comics artists
Living people
The Beano people
The Dandy people
Year of birth missing (living people)